The Korean Peasants League (KPL) is a NGO whose members are South Korean farmers.

The KPL was involved in demonstrations in 2003 MC5 in Cancun, Mexico, and one farmer stabbed himself to death during the protest.

A video interview was conducted with KPL spokesperson [name unclear] after the event.

References

External links
  Korean Peasants League

Political organizations based in South Korea
Rural community development